Abaújalpár is a village in Borsod-Abaúj-Zemplén county, Hungary.

Few Jews lived in the village and to this day there are Jewish gravestones in the area.

References

External links 
 Street map 

Populated places in Borsod-Abaúj-Zemplén County